Văratic is a village in Rîșcani District, Moldova.

Notable people
 Anatol Șalaru

References

Villages of Rîșcani District
Populated places on the Prut